The Thanet Canal, also known as the Springs Branch, is a short branch of the Leeds and Liverpool Canal, in North Yorkshire, England. It leaves the main canal in Skipton, and runs to some loading wharfs near Skipton Castle, which were used to load limestone from local quarries into boats for onward shipment. It was opened in 1773, and extended in 1794.

History
Lord Thanet, who was the owner of Skipton Castle in the late 18th Century, owned some limestone quarries near to the castle. When the constructors of the Leeds and Liverpool Canal were building their main line, he petitioned them to alter its route to better serve his quarries. This they refused to do, and so on 10 May 1773 he obtained an act of Parliament which authorised the construction of a branch canal to serve this purpose. The Act did not authorise the raising of capital, as Lord Thanet financed the canal himself, and it was constructed mainly on his own land. Its alternative title of the Springs Branch comes from the fact that the original Act was for a Canal from a Place called the Spring, lying near Skipton Castle.

The branch was built quickly, as it was only about one third of a mile (0.5 km) long. It left the Leeds and Liverpool canal in the centre of Skipton, and ran around the back of the castle to some loading chutes, into which limestone from the quarries was tipped. In 1785, the Leeds and Liverpool Canal Company took over the lease of the canal. In 1794, a 240 yd (220m) extension was constructed, to a new loading dock, which was linked to quarries by a tramway. Much of the limestone went to the Low Moor Ironworks in Bradford, where it was used in the smelting of iron. It was also used as road stone, and some of it was burnt to produce lime, for use as a fertiliser and in the production of mortar.

As built, the tramway terminus was a lot higher than the canal, and long chutes were used to load the limestone into boats. Because this caused damage to the boats and the noise disturbed the occupants of the castle, a steeper tramway was constructed, which resulted in shorter chutes, less noise and less damage. One of the shorter metal chutes is still visible on the canal bank, below the castle walls.

Since 2016 the branch has been closed beyond Mill Bridge after a fall of rock from Skipton Castle.

See also

Canals of Great Britain
History of the British canal system

Bibliography

References

Canals in North Yorkshire
1773 establishments in England
Canals opened in 1773